Haldor Johan Hanson (June 24, 1856 – December 14, 1929) was an American hymn writer, publisher and author.

Background
Haldor Johan Hanson was born in Fusa in the county of Hordaland near Bergen, Norway to Hans Lammenaes and Herborg (Lønningdahl).  He emigrated with his family in 1865, at the age of nine, to Grand Mound, Iowa, where his parents farmed. Hanson enrolled at Luther College graduating in 1883. Hanson studied at the Music Conservatory of Chicago from 1883-1884.

Career
Hanson taught at Willmar Seminary (academy) in Willmar, Minnesota, 1885-1887, before returning to Luther College to teach music and mathematics from 1888-1890. Hanson served as principal of  Decorah School of Music in 1889 which was incorporated into the Luther College the following year. Hanson left Luther in 1891 to studied music in Weimar, Germany from 1891-1892.

Returning to Luther College in 1894, he was appointed as the first professor of music in 1895. He continued to serve on the faculty until 1904. Hanson served as organizer and conductor of the Luther College choirs from 1882-1883. He organized the Decorah Choral Union in 1889. In 1895 Hanson started the Luther College Musical Union. In October 1895, Hanson was placed in charge of the museum at Luther College where he served as Curator until 1902. Ultimately Hanson resigned his appointment at Luther in 1904 at least in part because of his disagreement with President College Christian Keyser Preus.

Hanson moved to Chicago where he became a book and music dealer, publisher and author. He was proprietor of the Northern Book and Music Company which published the monthly Norwegian-American magazine, Idun: Tidsskrift for Literatur, Musik, etc. Hanson served as its editor during the magazine’s run from 1908-1910. Among Hanson’s other activities was his service on the editorial staff of the Norwegian-American newspaper, Skandinaven. In 1904 he compiled an index to Maanedstidende and Kirketidende, the church paper for  the Norwegian Synod. The first edition of an English-Norwegian-Danish dictionary compiled by Hanson was published in 1909 and reprinted in several subsequent editions. In 1916, he composed a Cantata for Christmas-tide and formulated the Norsk-Amerikansk Julebog in 1921. He also translated a poem by Henrik Ibsen titled Terje Vigen.

After Hanson’s death, his library collection of Norwegian Americana was donated to the Luther College Library. The Personal Papers and records of Haldor J. Hanson can be found in the Luther College Archives in the  Preus Memorial Library.

Selected works
Harpetoner : en udvalgt samling af tre- og firstemmige sange (Decorah, Iowa: B. Anundsen's forlag, 1892)
Register til Kirkelig maanedstidende, mars 1855-december 1873 og Evang. Luth. kirketidende januar 1874-december 1902 (Decorah, Iowa: Lutheran Publishing House, 1904)
Cantata for Christmas-tide : for soli, chorus, piano or organ (Decorah, Iowa: Lutheran Pub. House, 1916) 
Norsk-amerikansk julebog, 1921  (Chicago: Northern Book and Music, 1921)
Norsk-Dansk-Engelsk ordbog : udarbeidet for "Skandinaven  (Chicago: J. Anderson Publishing, 1925)
Terje Vigen : translation of a poem by Henrik Ibsen (Chicago: Northern Book & Music, 1929)

References

Other sources
Nelson, David T.  Luther College, 1861-1961 (Decorah, Iowa : Luther College Press, 1961)
Luther College Faculty, Luther College Through Sixty Years, 1861-1921 (Minneapolis, MN: Augsburg Publishing House, 1922) 
Nelson, Marion J., Material Culture and People’s Art Among the Norwegians in America (Northfield, MN: The Norwegian-American Historical Association, 1994) 
Norlie, Olaf M., History of the Norwegian People in America (Minneapolis, MN: Augsburg Publishing House, 1925)

External links
Luther College Library Haldor Hanson Collection of Norwegian Americana

People from Iowa
People from Fusa
1856 births
1929 deaths
American Lutherans
Norwegian emigrants to the United States
American newspaper editors
19th-century American writers
American Lutheran hymnwriters